A Perfect Hero is a 1991 TV drama serial set in World War II England. It was produced by Havahall Pictures in association with LWT for ITV and first broadcast at 9:00pm on Friday 17 May 1991 and ran for six episodes. It was broadcast in the US as part of Masterpiece Theatre during Season 21 that ran from 1991–1992.

Plot summary
The miniseries is about a young RAF Fighter Pilot Flying Officer Hugh Fleming DFC, played by Nigel Havers, who is shot down during the Battle of Britain and is severely burned around the face and hands. While recovering and experiencing life as a scarred casualty of war, his colleagues and friends who had joined the RAF with him die one by one.

This series shows how burn victims are treated and how they have to recuperate. It is hard for Fleming because he was an extremely handsome young man who had no problem dating women. With his face deformed by the burns and the plastic surgery, his life becomes a rather more traumatic one.

Some aspects of the story are reminiscent of the life of Richard Hillary, as recounted in his 1943 book, "The Last Enemy."

Music
Episode end credits play the song The Bells of Hell Go Ting-a-ling-a-ling, which somewhat lightens the mood.

External links

Masterpiece Archive on PBS

1991 British television series debuts
1991 British television series endings
1990s British drama television series
ITV television dramas
1990s British television miniseries
Aviation television series
English-language television shows
Television series by ITV Studios
Battle of Britain films
London Weekend Television shows
World War II television drama series